Cheraw State Park is located in the northeast corner of the U.S. state of South Carolina. This large park is best known for its championship 18-hole golf course and the  Lake Juniper, built by the Civilian Conservation Corps.  Visitors can rent kayaks, canoes, and non-motorized joy boats to explore the lake, as well as fish for the catfish, bass, and bream found in the lake. The park also has several cabins available for rent with views of the lake. There is no admission charge to Cheraw State Park.

History
In 1934, the U.S. Government, as well local citizens, donated  for the parks. In 1990, an additional  was purchased from A. Wannamaker. Many buildings which are still in use at the park, as well as the  lake, were built by the Civilian Conservation Corps. It is the oldest State Park in the South Carolina Park System and the largest originating from the CCC.

References

External links
Official page
SCIway site

State parks of South Carolina
Civilian Conservation Corps in South Carolina
Protected areas of Chesterfield County, South Carolina